Grand Calais Terres et Mers (before 2017: Communauté d'agglomération du Calaisis) is an agglomeration community created on 28 December 2000 and located in the Pas-de-Calais département, in northern France. It was expanded with four communes from the Communauté de communes des Pays d'Opale on 1 December 2019. Its area is 184.1 km2. Its population was 104,367 in 2018, of which 72,929 in Calais proper.

It comprises the following 14 communes:

Les Attaques
Bonningues-lès-Calais 
Calais
Coquelles
Coulogne
Escalles
Fréthun
Hames-Boucres
Marck
Nielles-lès-Calais
Peuplingues 
Pihen-lès-Guînes 
Saint-Tricat 
Sangatte

References

External links 
 Official Website

Calais
Calais